The Followers of Zainab Brigade (Persian/Dari:  or , Liwa Zeinabiyoun or Lashkare Zeinabiyoun), literally Zainebiyoun Brigade, also known as Zainebiyoun Division, is a pro-government militia fighting in Syria composed of Shia Pakistanis. It draws recruits mainly from Shia Pakistanis living in Iran, ethnic Hazaras and Baltis in Pakistan and native Shia of Khyber Pakhtunkhwa. 

It was formed and trained by the Iranian Revolutionary Guards and operates under their command. Initially tasked with defending the Sayyidah Zaynab Mosque, it has since entered frontlines across Syria. Its dead are buried primarily in Iran. Approximately 158 of their fighters have died in Syria as of March 2019, excluding those killed in Israeli airstrikes. According to recent estimations, the total number of Pakistani fighters on the brigade hardly exceeds 800.

History
Pakistanis have been fighting in Syria since 2013. They originally fought in the Afghan Liwa Fatemiyoun, and only became numerous enough to warrant a distinct brigade in early 2015. Some of the fighters are Hazara and Baloch while others are Pashtun (mainly from Parachinar), Punjabi or Balti from Gilgit-Baltistan and Karachi. Like other Shia foreign brigades in Syria, it is funded, trained, and overseen by the Iranian Revolutionary Guard Corps. 

Its official purpose is to defend the Sayyidah Zaynab Mosque (the shrine of Zaynab bint Ali, sister of Imam Hussain and granddaughter of the prophet Muhammad) and other Shia holy sites in Syria. It operates primarily in Damascus defending these holy sites. However, since 2015, it has also engaged in offensive action around Daraa and Aleppo, along with other foreign Shia fighters.

On 9 April 2015, seven fighters were killed defending the Imam Hasan Mosque in Damascus and were buried in Qom, Iran. In March 2016, six fighters were killed defending the Imam Reza shrine, also buried in Qom. On 23 April, five more fighters were killed. An estimated 69 fighters were killed between November 2014 and March 2016.

In early 2018 the group was involved in the Battle of Khasham against US special forces and the US-backed Syrian Democratic Forces.

Reaction in Pakistan
In December 2015, a bomb killed 25 and injured over 30 in Parachinar, Khyber Pakhtunkhwa. Terrorist group Lashkar-e-Jhangvi claimed responsibility, and said that it was "revenge for the crimes against Syrian Muslims by Iran and Bashar al-Assad" and threatened to continue terror attacks if Parachinar citizens did not "stop sending people to take part in Syrian war".

The government of Pakistan officially denies the presence of Pakistani fighters in Syria, and has been reluctant to take back members of the brigade caught in Syria.

Brigade Commander Haj Haider activities and his death
The Saqib Haider Karbalai, Muhammad Jannati also known as Haj Haider was a Pakistani Pashtun Shia militant belongs from the Parachinar, He was the commander of the Zainabiyoun Brigade, which includes Pakistani fighters trained by the Quds Force in the Revolutionary Guards to fight in Syria and Iraq The group's officially designated purpose, according to the Iranian government and affiliated news sources, is the defense of the shrine of Zaynab bint Ali, the granddaughter of Prophet Muhammad, and to fight "takfiri terrorists" in Syria, which would come to include the Islamic State (IS). The Haj Haider mostly actively command the operations in Battles of Aleppo, Deir ez-Zor, Palmyra against Islamic State and other takfiri terrorists.In 2017 the commander of the Zainabiyoun Brigade Haj Haider gone missing during fighting in Hama offensive (March–April 2017) against Islamic State The Iranian authorities confirmed his death in 2019 authorities reported that the body of the Zainabiyoun Brigade commander was transferred to Tehran two years after he was killed in the Syrian city of Hama. He was beheaded by the terrorist ISIS According to the authorities, the identity of the commander of the Zainabiyoun Brigade was recently identified after a DNA test, and he was transferred to Tehran to be buried on Thursday authorities also indicated that “his body is without a head and without an arm And he was killed in April 2017 in the Tal Turabi area in Hama governorate during offensive, Qassem Soleimani said about him: “He was one of the best around me.”, according to Pakistani authorities The Saqib Haider Karbalai  killed many Pakistani Taliban and Sipah e Sahaba, Lashkar-e-Jhangvi based Anti-Shia Takfiri extremists during 2007 Kurram Agency conflict According to the authorities he helped Pakistan Army against terrorists in which he also got wonded.The afterward Sipah e Sahaba accused Saqib Haider Karbalai as a member of Sipah-e-Muhammad Pakistan but failed to prove, unknown commander after the death of Haj Haider since 2017, however the Brigade still active performing operations against Islamic State in Syria, In early 2018 the group was involved in the Battle of Khasham against US special forces and the US-backed Syrian Democratic Forces.

See also
Foreign fighters in the Syrian civil war

Liwa Fatemiyoun
List of armed groups in the Syrian Civil War
Holy Shrine Defender

References

Axis of Resistance
Entities related to Iran Sanctions
Iran–Pakistan relations
Jihadist groups in Syria
Military units and formations established in 2015
Pakistan–Syria relations
Pro-government factions of the Syrian civil war
Shia Islam in Pakistan
Khomeinist groups